The Venezuela Symphony Orchestra is an orchestra in Venezuela, founded in 1930.  They perform at the Ríos Reyna concert-hall in the Teresa Carreño Cultural Complex.

See also 
Venezuelan music

References
Venezuela Symphony Orchestra history

Musicians 

OSV Year 2005

Sede permanente:

Sala Ríos-Reyna

Teatro Teresa Carreño 

Junta Directiva

Presidente:
Alejandro Ramírez
Vice-Presidente:
Angelo Pagliuca
Secretario de Actas:
Ruben Oscher
Secretario de Propaganda:
Mark Friedman
Vocal:
Lucía Colombo Pastori

Comisión Artística
Joel Arias.
Ricardo Alvarado.
Domingo Pagliuca.
Olga Tkachenko.
Alfonso López.
Alejandro Ramírez.

Profesor Emérito:
Alberto Flamini

Coordinador Acervo
Histórico 75 Aniversario:
José Bergher

Investigación y Textos de los
Próceres de la OSV:
Alejandro Ramírez

 
MÚSICOS 2005

Violines Primeros

Alfonso López (Concertino).
Domingo García*.
Dmitri Pylenkoy.
Susana Salas.
Alejandro Ramírez.
Ernesto Parisca.
Aquiles Hernández.
Olena Vrublevska-Bastidas.
Pedro Guerrero.
Vianet García.
Antonio Vásquez.
Angela Domínguez.
Ernesto Niño.
Julio César Lara.
Zamira Briceño.

Violines Segundos

Sigfrido Chiva (Solista).
Johan De Jesús Chapellín *.
José Domínguez.
Crismary García.
Lucía Alomoto.
Randy Laya.
Frank Vicent.
Margarita Rotinova.
Liber Cuervos.
Isabel Camacho.
Carlos Romero.
Daniel García.

Violas

Olga Tkachenko (Solista).
José Olmedo*.
José Patiño.
Rubén Haddad.
Carlos Paúl Rondón.
Lisandro Morales.
Ana María Oviol.
Adriana Vírgüez.
Eduardo Barradas.
Jeli Herrera.

Cellos

Carlos Izcaray (Solista).
Alfredo García*.
Juan Carlos Navas.
María Alejandra Saturno.
Angela Ramírez.
Mario Arias.
Luis Alfredo Farfán.
Gabriela Jiménez.
Rosángela Bustillos.
Bogdan Trochanowski.

Contrabajos

Carlos Valenzuela (Solista).
Gustavo Ruiz*.
Miguel González Kong.
César Ortega.
José Alexis Cervantes.
Mylene Zambrano.
Félix Tovar.
Nora Arenas.
Alexis Cedeño.
José Aparicio.

Flautas

Glenn Michael Egner (Solista).
María Gabriela Rodríguez**.
Lucía Colombo Pastori.
Andrés Eloy Rodríguez.

Oboes

Lido Guarneri (Solista).
Jorge Alcarra**.
Laura López*.
Hermes Sánchez.

Corno Inglés

Claudio Bondy*.

Clarinetes

Mark Friedman (Solista).
Alejandro Montes de Oca**.
Alessandro García Mendoza.

Clarinete Bajo

Eleonora Troncone*.

Fagotes

Filiberto Núñez (Solista).
Geronis Bravo**.
Ruben Oscher*.

Contrafagot

Georges Philippart*.

Cornos

Joel Arias (Solista).
Eduardo Arias **.
Atahualpa Vegas*.
Guiomar Hernández.
Liber Oscher.
Benjamín Adriani.

Trompetas

Vicente Freijeiro **.
Jonás Rodríguez*.
Bogdan Kalmouk*.
Pedro González.

Trombones

Angelo Pagliuca (Solista).
Domingo Pagliuca **.
Miguel Sánchez *.

Trombón Bajo

Eduardo Medouze*.

Tuba

Esteban Villegas (Solista).

Arpa

Anna De Rogatis.

Timbales y Percusión 

Ricardo Alvarado (Solista).
Mauricio García.
María Carolina Redondo.
Ronald Bonilla.
Denis M. Fallas.
 

Teclados

Arnaldo Pizzolante (Solista).

Principal de Sección = (Solista)
Asistente *
Solista Asociado **

Comisionado:
Susana Salas

Logística y Administración

Coordinador del Archivo Musical:
Glenn M. Egner

Asistente a la
Junta Directiva:
Sahily Hernández

Secretaria de
la Junta Directiva:
Liliam Núkez

Ingeniería de Sonido:
Rafael Rondón

Asistente:
Diego Silva

Asistente de Producción:
Jaime Rodríguez

Personal Técnico:
José A. Montenegro
Nelson Rodríguez
Omar Pérez
Jhonny Marimón

Contador:
Alexis Bello

Administrador:
Toni Padilla

Asistente Administrativo:
Yamilet Bolívar

Recepcionista:
Ana Portuguez 

Motorizado:
José Chiramo

Mensajero:
Henry Zambrano

Mantenimiento:
Nidia Rodríguez

MINISTERIO
DE EDUCACIÓN
CULTURA
Y DEPORTES

External links 
Venezuela Symphony Orchestra official site
Venezuela Symphony Orchestra discography

Musical groups established in 1930
Venezuelan orchestras
1930 establishments in Venezuela
Caracas